Sir John Moore Caldicott  (12 February 1900 – 31 January 1986) was a Rhodesian government minister.

Early life
John Moore Caldicott was born in Moreton in Marsh, Gloucestershire, on 12 February 1900 the son of solicitor John Croydon Moore Caldicott and Lilian Caldicott. His paternal grandfather was John William Caldicott, the Rector and Dean of Shipston-on-Stour and the headmaster of Bristol Grammar School. Caldicott was education first at Malvern Preparatory School in Worcestershire and then at Shrewsbury School. After coming of age, Caldicott enlisted as a Private (Cadet) in the Royal Air Force on 22 April 1918 and undertook his training during the final months of the war, before being placed on the reserve on 11 March 1919. He was granted an honorary commission as a 2nd Lieutenant on 4 February 1919.

Emigration to Africa
Following the end of his war service, on 4 March 1921 Caldicott, at the age of 21, sailed from London aboard the British India steamship SS Nevasa for Mombasa, Kenya Colony. However, by 1925 he had returned to England, and on 2 October 1925 departed Southampton aboard the Union-Castle steamship RMS Briton for Cape Town, to settle as a tobacco farmer in the Umvukwes District of Southern Rhodesia. In 1943–1945 Caldicott served as the President of the Rhodesia Tobacco Association. In 1945 he married Evelyn Macarthur, who had two existing children, and they had a son together, Michael John Caldicott. In 1946 he was elected President of the Rhodesian National Farmers' Union until 1948, which gave him a prominent platform for elected office.

Southern Rhodesia Legislative Assembly

Caldicott stood as a candidate for Sir Godfrey Huggins' United Party at the general election of 1948 for the Legislative Assembly of Southern Rhodesia and was subsequently elected MP for Mazoe.

Federation Assembly and minister
In the first election of the Federation of Rhodesia and Nyasaland, Caldicott took 69% of the vote to win the seat of Darwin for the Federal Party.

With the end of the Federation in 1963, Caldicott retired from politics and returned to farming until 1970 when he took up residence in the Salisbury suburb of Greendale. In 1980, upon independence he opted to remain in the country and took up Zimbabwean citizenship. On 31 January 1986 at the age of 86 he died at the Parirenyatwa Hospital and was buried at Warren Hills Cemetery.

Honours
Caldicott was made Companion of the Order of St Michael and St George (CMG) in the 1955 Birthday Honours and appointed Knight Commander of the Order of the British Empire (KBE) in the 1964 New Year Honours. In 1953, as a member of parliament he received the Queen Elizabeth II Coronation Medal. He was also granted retention of the title "The Honourable" on 31 December 1963, for having served for more than three years as a Minister of the Federal Government of the Federation of Rhodesia and Nyasaland.

References

1900 births
1986 deaths
People educated at Shrewsbury School
Royal Air Force personnel of World War I
Royal Air Force Air Cadets
Finance ministers of Rhodesia
Rhodesian politicians
Rhodesian farmers
White Rhodesian people
People from Moreton-in-Marsh
British emigrants to Rhodesia
Zimbabwean people of English descent
Knights Commander of the Order of the British Empire
Federation of Rhodesia and Nyasaland people
Members of the Legislative Assembly of Southern Rhodesia
Members of the Rhodesia and Nyasaland Federal Assembly
Defence Ministers of Zimbabwe